This article lists Azerbaijani exonyms.

An exonym is a place name, used by non-natives of that place, that differs from the official or native name for that place. This article attempts to give all known Azerbaijani Turkish exonyms for all major cities and regions as well as some smaller towns that are historically or geographically important.

Azerbaijani Turkish has a wealth of exonyms in areas beyond the current borders of Azerbaijan notably those that were once part of Turkic Empires and its vassals and tributaries or within the Azerbaijani Turkish, or a Turkic sphere of cultural or economic influence.

In addition, Azerbaijani Turkish renders the names of other cities in a phonetic Azerbaijani Turkish spelling, e.g., Chicago as Çikaqo or Manchester as Mançester.  As these forms are not commonly used in Azerbaijani Turkish, there is not a systematic attempt to include them here.

Cities are grouped by country and then listed alphabetically by their current best-known name in English. The English version is followed by Azerbaijani Turkish variants in order of significance. Some of exonyms available of an Azerbaijani Wikipedia article for that city under that name which may also provide additional reference for the equivalence.  Any other equivalents without further footnotes should be viewed with caution.

Afghanistan
Afghanistan Əfqanıstan
Kabul Kəbil
Aqchah Axça, Ağca
Badakhshan Bədəxşan
Balkh Bəlx
Bamyan Bamyan, Bəmyan
Chaghcharan Çağçaran
Darwaz Darvaz
Farah Fərah
Fayzabad Fəyzabad
Ghazni Qaznə
Hazarajat Xəzəracat, Xəzəristan
Herat Hərat, Herat
Hindu Kush Hinduquş, Hindiquş
Islam Qala İslamqala
Jalalabad Cəlalabad
Kandahar Qəndəhar
Kunduz Qunduz
Mazari Sharif Məzarı Şərif, Məzar Şərif
Meymaneh Maymana, Meymanə, Maymanə
Morghab Murğab, Murqab
Musa Qala Musaqala
Oruzgan Uruzgan
Panjshir Pənşir, Pəncşir
Sar-e Pol Səri-Pul, Sarı Pul
Sheberghan Şıbırğan
Shir Khan Bandar Şirxan Bəndər, Gözəlqala 
Taloqan Talqan, Taluqan
Wakhan Vəxan, Vaxan
Zabulistan Zəbulistan
Zaranj Zərənc, Zərəng

Albania
Albania Arnavudluq, Arnaudluq, Albaniya
Tirana Tiran
Berat Bərat, Belqradı Arnavud, Arnavudbelqrad
Bilisht Bəhliştə, Bihliştə
Bojana (river) Boyana, Buna
Drin Dirin
Durrës Durac
Elbasan Elbasan, İlbasan
Iballë Altınəli
Ishëm İsmid, İzmid
Korçë Göricə
Krujë Ağcahasar, Axçahasar
Lake Skadar İşkodra Gölü, Boyana Gölü
Lezhë Leş, Eşim
Librazhd Libraş
Mallakastër Malqasra
Orosh Uruş
Sazan Island Sazan Adası
Shëngjin Şingin
Shijak Şayaq
Shkodër İşkodra
Shpat İşbat
Skrapar İsqarapar
Tepelenë Təpədələn
Vlorë Avlonya, Avloniya, Vlyora

Algeria
Algiers Əlcəzair, Cəzair
Annaba Ənnabə, Annabə
Béjaïa Bəcayə
Blida Bilidə
Cherchell Şerşel
Constantine Kosantin, Qozantin
Dellys Dellis
Collo əl-Qul
Hussein Dey Hüseyn Dayı
Mansourah Mənsurə, Mansurə
Médéa Medeyə
Mers El Kébir Mers əl-Kəbir
Oran Oran, Vəhran
Peñón of Algiers Əlcəzair Qayalığı
Sétif Sətif
Ténès Tənəs
Tizi Ouzou Tiziuzu
Tlemcen Tilimsan, Tilimsən

Armenia

Armenia Ermənistan, Çuxursəəd, Çuxursəd
Yerevan İrəvan, Rəvan, Rəvanqala
Abovyan Ellər
Aghavnadzor Aynazur
Aghin Ağın
Akhtala Aşağı Axtala, Gümüşxana
Akhuryan Düzkənd, Arpaçay
Alagyaz Alagöz, Camışlı
Alaverdi Allahverdi
Aparan Baş Abaran, Baş Aparan
Aragats Alagöz
Aragats, Aragatsotn Qəzənfər
Ararat Dəvəli
Areni Arpa
Arevshat Ağ Baş
Armavir Sərdarabad
Artashat Qəmərli
Artashavan İlançalan
Artik Ərtik
Ashtarak Əştərək
Ashotsk Qızıl Qoç
Aygedzor Qulalı, Güləli
Aygestan Ayaslı
Ayrum Böyük Ayrım
Azat Ağkilsə
Bazmaghbyur Təkiyə
Berd Tovuzqala
Berkanush Oğurbəyli
Chambarak Çəmbərək
Dalarik Mastara
Dilijan Dilican
Garni Baş Gərni
Gavar Kəvər
Goris Gorus
Gyumri Gümrü
Hartavan Qarakilsə
Hnaberd Qırxdəyirman
Hrazdan Aşağı Axta
Ijevan Karvansaray
Jamshlu Kiçik Camışlı
Jermuk Quşçu, İstisu
Kajaran Qacaran
Karmrashen Qaraburun, Qırmızılı
Kapan Qafan
Lori Loru
Maralik Molla Kökcə, Molla Göyçə
Martuni Aşağı Qaranlıq
Masis Uluxanlı
Mayisyan Ortakilsə
Meghri Mığrı
Metsamor Qəmərli
Mount Achkasar Ağçala dağı
Mount Aragats Alagöz dağı
Norashen Saçlı
Noyemberyan Barana
Odzun Uzunlar
Paghaghbyur Soyuqbulaq
Punik Dədəqışlaq
Sevan Lake Göyçə
Shamlugh Şamlıq
Spitak Hamamlı
Sisian Qarakilsə
Stepanavan Cəlaloğlu
Talin Yuxarı Talin
Torunik Şıxlar
Tsaghkadzor Dərəçiçək
Tsoghamarg Cızıxlar
Tumanyan Manas, Güllüdərə, Allahverdi
Vagharshapat (Echmiadzin) Üçkilsə
Vayk Soylan, Əzizbəyov
Vanadzor Qarakilsə
Vardenis Basarkeçər
Vedi Böyük Vadi
Voskevaz Qızıldəmir
Yeghegnadzor Keşişkənd

Australia
Australia Huland-Cədid (حولاند جديد), Avstraliya

Austria
Austria Nemçə, Şərqi Nemçə, Doğu Nemçə, Avtsriya
Vienna Vyana, Beç
Carinthia Karintiya
Deutschkreuz Alamanxaçı
Graz Qraç
Kahlenberg Alamandağı
Linz Lincə
Styria İstiriya

Belgium
Belgium Belçika, Belcik
Brussels Brüksel, Brüssel
Antwerp Anvers
Leuven Löven

Bosnia-Herzegovina
Bosnia and Herzegovina Bosna, Bosniya və Herseqovina
Sarajevo Saraybosna
Baščaršija Başçarşı
Bihać Bixaç
Bijeljina Biyelina
Čajniče Çayniçe
Čitluk Çitlik
Derventa Dərbənd
Foča Foça
Glamoč Qulamuç
Ilidža Ilıca
Jajce Yayçə, Yayca
Ključ Klivaç
Kozluk Qozluq
Ljubinje Lubin
Ljubuški Lubuşka
Nevesinje Nevesin
Nova Kasaba Yeni Qəsəbə
Odžak Ocaq
Počitelj Pöçiteli
Rogatica Çələbibazar
Rudo Soqul
Simin Han Simin Xan
Skender Vakuf İskəndər Vəqf
Sokolac Sokolçə
Stari Majdan Əski Meydan
Stolac İstolça
Šubin Şubin
Tomislavgrad Duvna
Trebinje Trəbinyə
Zvornik İzvornik

Bulgaria
Bulgaria Bulğarstan (Old Azerbaijani: بولغارستان), Bolqarıstan
Sofia Sofiya, Sofya
Balchik Balcıq
Bankya Bankə
Batak Bataq
Blagoevgrad Yuxarı Cümə
Burgas Burqaz
Dobrich Hacıoğlu Bazarcıq
Golden Sands Altın Qumlar
Gorna Oryahovitsa Yuxarı Raxova
Haskovo Xasköy
Hisarya Hasariya
Kardzhali Qırcaəli
Kazanlak Qazanlıq
Koprivshtitsa Arvadalan
Kyustendil Köstəndil
Lovech Lofça
Montana Qutlu Viçə
Nesebar Nəsəbar
Pazardzhik Bazarcıq, Tatar Bazarcıq
Pleven Plevnə
Pliska Ağababa
Plovdiv Filibə
Pomorie Ahyolu
Ruse Ruscuq
Shumen Şumnu
Silistra Silistrə
Sliven İslimiyə, İslivnə
Smolyan Başmaqlı
Stara Zagora Əski Zağra
Sunny Beach Günlü Sahil
Targovishte Əski Cümə
Tryavna Trevnə
Tutrakan Turtuqaya, Tutruqay
Vratsa İvraca
Yambol Yanbolu

Central Asia
Central Asia Türküstan
Amu Darya Ceyhun (جيحون), Amudərya
Aral Sea Aral Gölü
Caspian Sea Xəzər Dənizi
Fergana Valley Fərqanə Vadisi
Silk Road İpək Yolu, Qutay Yol
Syr Darya Seyhun, Sırdərya
Transoxiana Mavərənnəhr

China
China Xita, Kitay, Çin
Beijing Xanbalıq (汗八里 / Khanbaliq), Pekin
Guangzhou Xanfu (خانفو)
Hangzhou Kansay, Qansay
Qinghai Göygöl (Xöxnuur — "Blue Sea",  — "Blue Sea")
Qinghai Lake Göy göl ( — "Blue Sea",  — "Blue Sea",  — "Blue Sea")
Quanzhou Zeytun
Manchuria Maçin (ماپين)
Nanjing Nəncin, Nankin
Shandong Şantun, Sandunbalıq
Shenyang Mukden
Tianjin Təncin
Tibet Tübüt (تُبُتْ)
Yellow Sea Sarı Dəniz

Xinjiang Uyghur Autonomous Region
Xinjiang Doğu Türküstan, Şərqi Türküstan
Ürümqi Ürümçi, Urumçi
Aksu Ağsu
Almaliq Almalıq
Altay Altay
Artux Atuş, Artuş
Bortala Börüdala, Börtala
Gaochang Qaraxoca
Hami Qumul
Hotan Xotən, Xotan
Jimsar Beşbalıq
Karakax Qaraqaş
Karamay Qaramay
Kashgar Qaşqar, Qaşğar
Kucha Küçə
Tacheng Çöçək
Taklamakan Desert Təklə-Məkan
Tarim Basin Tarım
Tian Shan Tanrı Dağı
Turpan Turfan
Yarkant Yarkənd
Yengisar Yeni Hasar
Yining Külcə

Croatia
Croatia Xorvatıstan, Xorvatiya
Zagreb Zaqreb, Zağreb
Brač Braç Adası
Dubrovnik Raquza
Nijemci Nemçə
Osijek Ösək, Ösek
Požega Pojeqa
Pula Pola
Zadar Cara

Cuba
Cuba Quba, Amerika Qubası

Cyprus
Cyprus Qıbrıs, Kipr
Nicosia Lefkoşa

Czech Republic
Czech Republic Çex Cümhuriyyəti, Çex eli, Çexlər, Çexiya, Çex Respublikası
Elbe Elbə
Jablonec nad Nisou Nəysədəki Yablonets, Naysedəki Yablonets, Nisadakı Yablonets
Prague Pirağa, Praq, Praqa, Praha, Prağa
Sudetes Südetlər
Ústí nad Labem Elbədəki Usti

Egypt
Egypt Misir
Cairo Qahirə, Qaşrom
Khan el-Khalili Xan Xəlil
Mokattam əl-Muqəttəm dağları
Ridaniya Ridaniyə
Alexandria İskəndəriyə, İsgəndəriyə
Asyut Əsyut
Bilbeis Bilbəys
Damanhur Dəmənhur
Damietta Dimyat
El-Mahalla El-Kubra əl-Məhəllə əl-Kübrə
Faiyum Fəyyum
Girga Circə
Giza Cizə
Imbaba İmbaba
Ismaïlia İsmayıliyə, İsmailiyə, İsmailiyyə
Kom Ombo Qum Ombu, Qum Umbu
Luxor əl-Uksur, əl-Uqsur
Mansoura əl-Mansurə, əl-Mənsurə
Minya Minyə
Monufia Mənufiyyə, Mənufiyə
Nekhel ən-Nəxl qalası
Port Said Bur Səid, Liman Səid, Port Səid
Qasr Ibrim İbrim
Qusayr Qusəyr
Rosetta Rəşid
Sharm el-Sheikh Şarm əl-Şeyx, Şarm əş-Şeyx
Shibin Al Kawm Şibin əl-Qum
Shubra el-Kheima Şübrə əl-Xeymə
Suez Süvəyş

Eritrea
Eritrea Eritrə, Əritrə, Eritreya
Arkiko Hərqiqu, Harqiqu, Hirqiqo
Asmara Əsməra
Assab Əsəb
Dahlak Archipelago Dəhlək
Massawa Masava

Estonia
Estonia Estoniya, İstuniya (إستونيا)
Tallinn Tallinn

Ethiopia
Ethiopia Həbəşistan
Abyssinia Həbəşistan
Addis Ababa Əddis-Əbəbə
Shashamane Şaşmanə
Weldiya Vəlidiyə, Vəlidiyyə

Europe
Europe Avropa
Adriatic Sea Adriatik dənizi
Alps Alplar, Alp Dağları
Black Sea Qara dəniz
Danube Dunay, Tuna, Tınay
Mediterranean Sea Ağ dəniz, Aralıq dənizi
Rhine Reyn

Finland
Finland Finland, Finlandiya, Səqləblər, Saamilər, Finlər
Janakkala Yanaqqala
Jyväskylä Yüvəskülə
Scandinavia Cəzirət əs-Səqləb (Cəzirətül Səqləb جزيرة الصقالب), Səqləb yarımadası, İskandinaviya, İskandinaviya yarım cəzirəsi

France
France Fransa, Firəngistan
Bordeaux Bordo
La Marche əl-Mənşə, La Manş
Marseille Marsilya, Marsiliya, Marsel
Nice Nis, Nitsa
Ramatuelle Rəhmətulla, Rəhmətullah, Ramatüel
Toulouse Toluşa, Tuluza
Tours Bələd əş-Şühəda, Tur 
Versailles Versal, Versay

Georgia
Georgia Gürcüstan
Tbilisi Tiflis
Abastumani Abbas-Tuman
Abkhazia Abxaz, Abxaziya, Abxazstan
Gali Qal
Sukhumi Suqumqala
Adjara Acarıstan
Alazani Qanıx
Alazani Valley Alazan-Həftəran vadisi, Alazan–Əyriçay vadisi
Akhalkalaki Axılkələk
Akhaltsikhe Axısqa
Batumi Batum
Debed Tona, Tana, Borçalı çayı
Dedoplistsqaro Ceyrançöl
Javakheti Cavax
Imereti Başaçıq
Kakheti Qəxet
Khelvachauri Xelvaçavur
Kobuleti Çürüksu
Kutaisi Qutayıs
Kvemo Kartli Borçalı (According to the modern administrative division of Georgia, the territory of the historic Borçalı region roughly corresponds to the territory of the four southern municipalities of the Kvemo-Kartli region: Marneuli (Sarvan), Bolnisi (Çörük Qəmərli), Dmanisi (Başkeçid), Gardabani (Qarayazı))
Aiazmi Ayazma
Akayurta Ağayurd
Akhali-Mamudlo Yeni Mahmudlu
Akhalsheni Kərək
Akhghula, Akhghulari Ağqula, Ağqüllə
Akhkerpi Ağkörpü
Akhlo-Lalalo Axlılələ
Alavari Hallavar
Algeti Alget, Gorarxı
Amamlo Hamamlı
Ambartafa Ambartəpə
Ambarovka Ambarlı
Angrevani Əngirəvan
Araplo Araplı
Arjevan-Sarvani Ərcivan-Sarvan
Artaqla Ağtəhlə, Ağtəklə
Artsivani, Jinisi Cinis
Ashkala Aşqala
Avranlo Avranlı
Bailari Bəylər
Balakhauri Sayalıoğlu, Sisqala
Balichi Balıc, Balış
Baydari Baydar
Baytalo Baytallı
Bareti Başköy
Bediani Bədyan
Beitarafchi Bəytərəfçi
Bektakari, Bertakari Beytəkər
Beshtasheni Beşdaş, Beştaş
Bezaklo Bəzəkli
Birliki Birlik
Bolnisi Çörük Qəmərli, Bolus
Chanakhchi Çanaxçı
Chapala Qoçulu
Chivtkilisa Çiftkilisə, Cütkilsə
Cholmani Çölmən, Çölən
Chreshi Kipircik
Dagarakhlo Dağ Arıxlı
Dageti, Dagetkhachini Dağetxaçın
Damia Dəmyə
Damia-Giaurarkhi Dəmyə Görarxı
Darakoy Dərəköy
Darbazi Darboğaz
Dashbashi Daşbaşı (or Daşbaş)
Didi-Beglari Böyük Bəylər
Didi-Mughanlo Böyük Muğanlı
Dmanisi Başkeçid
Dzedzvnariani Aragöl
Dzveli-Kveshi Zol-Göyəç
Fakhralo Faxralı
Ganakhleba Anbarlı
Gantiadi Qalamşa
Gardabani Qarayazı, Qaratəpə
Gedagdaghi Gödəkdağ
Gedaklari Gödəklər
Geta Aşağı Güləver
Gora Canbağça
Gulbaghi Güllübağ
Gumbati Gümbət
Jandari Candar
Jankoshi Canxoş
Javshaniani Abdallı
Iakublo Yaquflu, Yaqublu
Ilmazlo İlməzli
Imiri İmir
Irganchey Yırğançay
Itsria Qaradaşlı
Kaburi Qabur
Kakliani Gəyliyən
Kamarlo Kəmərli
Kamishlo Qamışlı
Karajalari, Karajala Qaracalar
Kariani Çopurallar
Kasumlo Qasımlı
Kazreti Xəzəret
Kesalo Kosalı
Keshalo Keşəli
Khidiskuri Həsənxocalı
Kirikhlo Qırıxlı
Kirach-Mughanlo Çıraq-Muğanlı
Kirovka Mamey
Kizilajlo Qızılhacılı
Kizilkilisa Qızıl-Kilisə, Qızıl-Kilsə
Khakhalajvari Dəmirli
Khachkov Xaçköy
Khanji-Gazlo Xancığazlı
Khataveti Mollaəhmədli
Khojorni Xocornu
Khutor-Lejbadini Xutor-Lejbəddin, Xutor-Lecbəddin
Kokhta Axalıq
Kosalari Kosalar
Kushchi, (Marneuli Municipality) Quşçu
Kushchi, (Tsalka Municipality) Quşçu
Kvemo-Arkevani Aşağı Qoşakilsə
Kvemo-Bolnisi Kəpənəkçi, Bolus Kəpənəkçisi
Kvemo-Kharaba Aşağı Xaraba, Neon-Xaraba
Kvemo-Kulari Aşağı Qullar
Kvemo-Orozmani Aşağı Oruzman
Kvemo-Sarali Aşağı Saral
Lejbadini Lejbəddin, Lecbəddin
Mamishlo Məmişli
Mamkhuti Saraçlı
Manglisi Məngli
Marneuli Sarvan, Marneul
Mashavera Qoruncuq
Meore-Kesalo İkinci Kosalı
Mtisdziri Suqala
Mtskneti Əsmələr
Mukhrana Daşdıqullar, Daşlıqullar
Mushevani Dəllər
Nakhiduri Arıxlı, Aran Arıxlı
Nardevani Nərdivan
Nazarlo Nəzərli
Oliangi Öləng
Pantiani Armudlu
Patara-Beglari Bala Bəylər
Patara-Darbazi Bala Darvaz
Pirveli-Kesalo Birinci Kosalı
Parizi Bala Muğanlı
Poladauri Çatax
Ponichala Soğanlıq
Potskhveriani Babakişilər
Rustavi Bostandərə
Sabechisi Qaraköm
Sabereti Qaratikan
Sadakhlo Sadaxlı
Sagdrioni Yeddikilisə, Yeddikilsə
Sakire Qaşqatala
Samadlo Səmədli
Sameba Günyaqala
Samtredo Cəfərli
Samtsevrisi Şəmşiöyü
Saparlo Səfərli
Sarkineti Dəmirbulaq
Sartichala Sərtiçala
Savaneti İmirhəsən
Seidkhojalo Seyidqocalı
Senebi Sənab
Shaumiani Şüləver
Shikhilo Şıxlı
Shipiaki Şipək
Shua-Bolnisi İncəoğlu
Soghutlo Söyüdlü
Sopeli Bolnisi Xaçın
Talaveri Faxralı
Tamarisi Traubenberq, Traunbenberg
Tandzia Tağılı
Tarsoni Tərson
Tazakendi Təzəkənd
Tazakharaba Təzəxaraba, Təzə-Xaraba
Tejisi Təcis
Tekali Təkəli
Tetritsqaro Ağbulaq
Tikilisa Təkkilisə, Təkkilsə, Təkilisə
Tkispiri Boğazkəsən, Meşəağzı
Tnusi Dunus
Tsalka Barmaqsız
Tsopi Sop
Tsipori Yuxarı Güləver
Tsurtavi Kolagir
Ulashlo Ulaşlı
Vake Qarakilisə, Qarakilsə
Vanati Mığırlı
Zemo-Arkevani Yuxarı Qoşakilsə
Zemo-Karabulakhi Yuxarı Qarabulaq
Zemo-Kulari Yuxarı Qullar
Zemo-Orozmani Yuxarı Oruzman
Zemo-Sarali Yuxarı Saral
Lagodekhi Qabal
Lazeti (Lazona) Lazıstan
Mskhaldidi Armudlar, Sxəldi, Sxaltı
Poti Faş
Redoubt Kali Redut Qala, Redutqala
Sagarejo Qaraçöp (Qaraçöp is one of the parts of Sagarejo where live Azerbaijani Turks. It includes 8 Azerbaijani Turkish villages:)
Duzagrama Düzəyrəm, Əyrəm
Iormughanlo Muğanlı
Kazlari Qazlar
Keshalo Keşəli
Lambalo Ləmbəli
Paldo Baldoy, Baldo
Tulari Tüllər
Tsitsmatiani Qarabağlı, Qaramanlı
Samegrelo  Marqalıstan, Marqaliya, Meqrelistan
Shekvetili Şövkət El, Şövkət İl, Şövkətel, Şövkətil
Signagi Sığnaq
South Osetia Cənubi Osetiya, Güney Osetiya
Tskhinvali Şinval, Tsxinval
Tsikhisdziri Çömbərli, Qarahəsəli
Tsodoreti Codoret
Zvareti Sarallar

Germany
Germany Almaniya, Nemçə, Nemcə
Bayern Bavariya
Dresden Drezden
Frankfurt Mayndakı Frankfurt
Munich Münhen
Niedersachsen Aşağı Saksoniya
Nordrhein-Westfalen Quzey Ren-Vestfaliya, Şimali Ren-Vestfaliya
Sachsen Saksoniya
Stuttgart Ştutqart
Wesel Vezel

Gibraltar
Gibraltar Cəbəli-Tariq, Cəbəlütariq
Strait of Gibraltar Cəbəlütariq Boğazı

Greece
Greece Yunanıstan, Yonluq
Aegean Sea Adalar dənizi

Greenland
Greenland Qrönland, Qrenlandiya

Hungary
Hungary Macarıstan, Onoğurluq, On Oğur Eli
Buda Budin
Budapest Budin, Budapeşt
Bugac Boğac
Buják Buyaq
Győr Yanıqqala
Kecskemét Keçkemet
Miskolc Misqofça
Nagykanizsa Kanije, Qanijə
Pécs Peçoy, Peç
Rózsadomb Gültəpə
Szeged Segedin, Səgədin
Székesfehérvár İstolni Belqrad

India
India Hindistan
Delhi Şahcahanabad, Dehli
Agra Aqra
Ahmednagar Əhmədnağar, Əhmədnaqar
Atal Nagar Yeni Raypur
Aurangabad Övrənabad, Övrəngzib
Ayodhya Feyzabad
Bhagyanagar (Bhagya Nagaram) Heydərabad, Dar-ül-Cihad
Chennai Mədrəs
Edlawada Adilabad
Elagandhal Kərimnağar, Kərimnaqar
Deendyal Upadhya (Deen Dayal Nagar) Moğolsaray
Ghoghla Bəndəri Türk
Jaipur Caypur
Karnavati Əhmədabad
Kolkata Kəlkətə, Kalküta
Manukota Məhbubabad
Mumbai Mumbay, Bombey
Indrapuri Nizamabad
Dharashiv Osmanabad
Palamoor (Palamuru) Məhbubnağar, Məhbubnaqar
Pataliputra Patna
Pondicherry Puduçeri, Pondiçeri
Prayag (Prayagraj) Allahabad
Varanasi Bənarəs

Iran
Iran İran
Tehran Tehran, Dar öl-Xülafə
Ahvaz Əhvaz
Alamut Ələmut
Alamut Castle Ələmut qalası
Amol Amul
Arak Sultanabad, Ərak
Ardabil Ərdəbil
Avajiq Avacıq
Bandar Abbas Bəndər-Abbas
Bazargan Bazərgan
Birjand Bircənd
Bonab Bünab, Binab
Borujerd Bürucird
Bukan Bükan
Bushehr Buşəhr, Bəndər-Buşehr
Chaldoran Çaldıran
Damghan Damğan
Eslamshahr İslamşəhr
Esfahan İsfahan
Fīrūzābād Firuzabad
Gol Anbar Gül Anbar, Gül Ambar
Golestan Gülüstan
Gonbad-e Kavus Günbədqabus, Günbədkavus
Gorgan Gürgan
Hamadan Həmədan
Hashtrud Sərəskənd
Hormuz Island Hörmüz adası
Karahrud Kərəhrud
Karaj Kərəc
Kashan Kaşan
Kerman Kirman, Kərman
Kermanshah Kirmanşah
Khoramabad Xürrəmabad
Falak-ol-Aflak Castle Fələk-ül Əflək qalası
Greater Khorasan Böyük Xorasan
Khoy Xoy
Lake Urmia Urmu gölü, Urmiyə gölü
Larak Island Larak adası
Mahabad Soyuqbulaq
Maku Daşmakı, Makı
Qara Kelissa Qara Kilisə, Qarakilsə
Malard Mələrd
Maragheh Marağa
Mashhad Məşhəd
Meshk-e Anbar İşkənbər
Miandoab Qoşaçay
Naqadeh Sulduz
Nahavand Nəhavənd
Naqsh-e Rustam Nəqşi-Rüstəm
Neyshābūr Nişapur
Oshnaviyeh Üşnü, Üşnəviyyə
Parsabad Qoçkəndi
Persepolis Təxt-i Cəmşid
Piranshahr Piranşəhr, Xana
Qareh Zia' od Din Qaraziyaəddin
Qasr-e Shirin Qəsri Şirin
Qatur Qotur
Ghazwin Qəzvin
Qeshm Qeşm adası, Qişm adası
Qom Qum
Rasht Rəşt
Rey Rey, Avrop, Ərşəkiyə (Arşakiyə)
Sabzevar Səbzivar, Beyhaq
Salmas Salmas (Səlmas), Dilməqan
Sanandaj Sənəndəc
Saqiz Saqqız
Sardasht Sərdəşt
Sarpol-e Zahab Sərpol Zəhab
Sarakhs Sərəxs
Shahindej Sayınqala
Shiraz Şiraz
Showt Şot
Siah Cheshmeh Qaraeyni
Tabas Təbəs
Tabriz Təbriz
Takab Tikantəpə
Torkamanchay Türkmənçay
Urmia Urmu, Urmiyə
Yazd Yəzd
Zanjan Zəncan

Iraq
Iraq İraq
Baghdad Bağdad
Amara Əmarə
Basra Bəsrə
Diwaniyah Divaniyə
Diyala Diyalə
Al Khalis Xəlis
Baqubah Bəquba
Khanaqin Xanaqin
Fallujah Fəllucə
Haditha Hadisə
Hillah Hillə
Karbala Kərbəla
Kirkuk Kərkük
Altun Kupri Altunköprü, Altınkörpü
Daquq Daquq, Toyuq
Hawija Havicə
Yayci Yaycı
Kut Kut, Qut
Najaf Nəcəf
Nasiriyah Nasiriyə
Ramadi Ramadi, Ramadiyə
Saladin Governorate Səlahəddin mühafəzası
Tal Afar Təlafər
Iraqi Kurdistan Türkməneli, Türkmaneli
Dohuk Dəhuk
Amadiya Amadiyə, İmadiyə 
Bakhetme Baxetmə
Dawodiya Davudiyə
Koy Sanjaq Köysancaq
Rawandiz Rəvandiz
Erbil Ərbil
Halabja Hələbcə
Sulaymaniyah Süleymaniyə
Chamchamal Çömçəmal
Aghjalar Ağcalar
Qadir Karam Qadir-Kərəm
Darbandikhan Dərbəndixan
Qaradagh Qaradağ

Israel
Israel İsrail, Ərzi Mövud, Fələstin
Tel Aviv Təl-Əviv
Jerusalem Qüds, Yeruşəlim
Acre Əkka
Ashdod Aşdod, İsdud
Ashqelon Asqalan
Bayt 'Itab Beyti Ətab
Bait Gubrin Beyti Cibrin
Beersheba Bir-əs-Saba
Beit She'an Bəysan
Elat Eylat
Faluja Fəllucə
Hadera Xudeyrə, Hüdeyrə
Haifa Hayfa
Lod əl-Ludd, Lod
Mount Carmel Kərmil dağı
Mount of Olives Zeytun dağı
Nahariyya Nəhriyə
Nazareth Nasıra
Negev Nəcəf çölü
Ramla Rəmlə
Safed Səfəd
Sea of Galilee Cəlilə dənizi, Təbəriyə gölü (Təbəriyyə gölü)
Tiberias Təbəriyə, Tiberyə
Umm al-Fahm Umm əl-Fəhm
Western Wall Ulaşma yeri, Ağlama divarı

Italy
Italy İtalyan Cümhuriyyəti, İtaliya
Acireale Yac
Agrigento Kərkənd, Kirkənt
Alcamo Qamuq, əl-Qamuq
Alessandria İsgəndəriyyə, İtalyan İsgəndəriyyəsi
Bagheria Bab əl-Qərib
Bologna Bolonya
Calatafimi-Segesta Qala əl-Fimi, Qəlat əl-Fimi
Caltanissetta Qala ən-Nisa, Qəlat ən-Nisa
Caltavuturo Əbü Tövr, Qala əl Əbu Tövr, Qəlat əl Əbu Tövr
Canicattì Xəndək əl-Tin
Catanzaro Qatansar
Catania Qətaniyyə, Bələd əl-Fil, Mədinət əl-Fil
Cefalù Gafludi
Enna Qəsr əl-Yahya
Florence Floransa, Florensiya
Gela Mədinə əl-Əmud, Mədinət əl-Əmud
Genoa Ceneviz, Cenova
Lascari Mədinə əl-Əsgəri
Mantua Mantova
Marsala Mərsəli (Marsa Ali)
Mineo Qəsr əl-Mina
Misilmeri Əmirqala (Castello dell'Emiro)
Naples Napoli, Nablus, Neapol
Padua Padova
Palermo Palermo, Balarm
Palombara Sabina Polonbara Səbinə
Pantelleria Qəvsərə, Qəsvərə, Bint ər-Riyad
Regalbuto Rəhal Əbdüd
Reggio Calabria Rəfah
Rome Qızılalma, Qızıl Alma, Roma, Rim
Savoca Qala Zəbut
Sicily Səqqəliyə, Siqilliyyə, Siciliya, Siciliyə
Syracuse Sərqusə
Taormina Muizziyyə, Əlmuizziyyə
Venezia Venedik
Zisa əl-Əziz

Japan
Japan Cabarqa (جَابَرْقَا), Japoniya, Yaponiya

Jordan
Jordan Ürdün, İordaniya
Ajloun Aclun
Aqaba Əqəbə
Jerash Cəraş
Karak Kərək
Ma'an Məan
Mafraq Məfrəq
Petra Bətrə
Zarqa Zərqa

Kazakhstan
Kazakhstan Qazaxıstan, Qazağıstan
Astana Astanə, Ağmola, Astana, Nur-Sultan
Aktau Ağdağ
Aktobe Ağtəpə
Almaty Almalı
Atyrau Ətraf, Atırav
Ayagoz Ayagöz
Baikonur Bayqonur
Ekibastuz İkibaşduz
Ishim River Əşil, Əşim
Jankent Yenikənd
Jezkazgan Cezqazan, Yezqazan
Karaganda Qarağanlı
Kokshetau Göyçədağ
Kostanay Qostanay
Kyzylorda Qızılordu
Mangyshlak Peninsula Manqışlaq
Oskemen Öskəmən
Pavlodar Kereku
Petropavl Qızılyar
Saray-Jük Saraycıq
Shymkent Çimkənd
Taldykorgan Dallıqorğan
Temirtau Dəmirdağ
Turkistan Türküstan
Ural River Yayıq
Zhetysu Yeddisu

Kosovo
Kosovo Kosova, Kosovo
Pristina or Prishtinë Priştine
Đakovica or Gjakova Yakova
Đeneral Janković or Hani i Elezit İlyasxan, Elezxan
Gnjilane or Gjilani Gülxan
Janjevo Yanova
Leposavić Albanik
Mališevo or Malishevë Malışova
Mamushë Mahmudşah, Mamuşa
Novo Brdo or Novobërdë Yeni Brod, Nobırda
Obilić Kastriot
Orahovac or Rahovec Raxovca
Peć or Pejë İpək
Prizren Pirzərin? Pürzərrin? (پرزرين)
Srbica Skenderay, İsgəndəray
Uroševac Ferizovik
Vitina Viti
Vučitrn or Vushtrri Vulçitirin? (وولچيترين)

Kyrgyzstan
Kyrgyzstan Qırğızıstan, Qırğız Cümhuriyyəti, Qırx Qız Eli
Bishkek Bişkek, Pişpək, Pişkək
Cholpon-Ata Çulpan-Ata
Balasagun Balasağun
Balykchy Balıqçı
Batken Batkənd, Batken
Isfana İsfana, Moğolbasan
Issyk Kul İsti göl, Isıq göl
Jalal-Abad Cəlal-Abad, Cəlalabad
Jeti-Ögüz Yeddi-Öküz
Kant Qənd
Kara-Balta Qara-Balta
Karakol Qaraqol
Karaköl Qaragöl
Kara-Suu Qara-Su, Qarasu
Kerben Kerben, Karvan
Kochkor-Ata Qoşqar-Ata, Qoçqar-Ata
Kyzyl-Kiya Qızıl-Qıya
Mailuu-Suu Maylı-Su, Maylısu
Naryn Narın
Osh Oş
Sulukta Sülüklü
Suyab Suyab, Ordukənd
Talas River Talas çayı
Tashkömür Daşkömür
Tokmok Toxmaq
Toktogul Toxtaqul
Uzgen Özkənd

Lebanon
Lebanon Lübnan, Livan
Beirut Beyrut
Baalbek Bəəlbək
Nabatieh Nəbatiyə
Sidon Sayda
Sin el Fil Sin əl-Fil
Tripoli Tarablusşam, Trablusşam
Tyre Sur
Zahlé Zəhlə

Libya
Libya Libya, Liviya, Trablusqərb
Tripoli Tarabulus-əl-Qərb, Tarabulusqərb
Ajdabiya Əcdəbiyə
Barca Barqa
Benghazi Binğazi, Benqazi
Derna Dərnə
Fezzan Fəzzan çölü
Gharyan Qaryan
Ghat Qat
Jabal al Gharbi Cəbəl əl-Qərbi
Sabha Səbha
Sirte Surt
Tripolitania Trablusqərb bölgəsi
Tobruk Tobruq
Zawiya Zaviyə

Lithuania
Most people who speak Azerbaijani Turkish borrow the names of Lithuanian cities from Russian. Some Azerbaijani speakers take names from the original (Lithuanian). But the names in this table are borrowed from the Karaim Turkic language, which use Hebrew alphabet.
Lithuania Litvaniya, Litvanya, Litva
Vilnius Vilnüs, Vilnə, Vilne, Vilniya
Alytus Alite
Biržai Birj
Elektrėnai Elektren
Jonava Yanev, Yanov, Yaneve
Jurbarkas Yurburq
Kėdainiai Keydan
Klaipėda Memel
Kretinga Kretingə, Kretinge, Kretinğ, Kretinq, Kretinx
Mažeikiai Majeyk
Marijampolė Məryəmpol, Mariampol
Panevėžys Ponevej, Panevej
Šiauliai Şavel
Šakiai Şaki
Širvintos Şirvint
Telšiai Telz, Telş
Trakai Trox, Troq (Karaim: Troch)
Ukmergė Vilkomir
Vilkaviškis Vilkovişk

Luxembourg
Luxembourg Lüksemburq
Schengen Şengen

Malta
Malta Maltız Cümhuriyyəti, Maltiz Respublikası, Malta
Valletta Muaviyə
L-Imdina Mədinə
Marsaxlokk Marsalşlokk
Żejtun Zeytun

Moldova
Moldova Moldaviya, Moldova, Boğdan
Chişinău Kişinöv, Kişineu, Kişinyov
Baimaclia, Cantemir Baymaqlı
Baimaclia, Căușeni Baymaqlı
Bălăbănești, Criuleni Balabaneş
Bălți Belçi
Bender Təkin, Bəndər, Təkinkeçər
Beștemac Beşdamaq
Cahul Qartal Ovası
Căinari Qaynar
Cairaclia Qayraqlı
Cantemir Qandəmir
Capaclia Qapaqlı
Caracui Qaraküy
Cazangic Qazancıq
Cenac Çanaq
Chioselia Kösəli
Cimișlia Çimişli
Ciobanovca Çobanova, Çobanoba, Çobanovka
Cioburciu, Ștefan Vodă Çoburçu
Cioburciu, Transnistria Çoburçu
Cîșla, Cantemir Qışla
Cîșla, Telenești Qışla
Ciuluc, Fălești Çuluq
Cobani Quman
Cogâlnic River Qunduq çayı
Cuciurgan Reservoir Qoçurğan Limanı
Drochia Dovdaqlı
Dușmani Düşman
Edineţ Yeddinci
Enichioi Yeniköy
Galați Qalas
Malcoci Malqoç
Orhei Şəhər əl-Cədid
Sadîc Sadıq
Ștefan Vodă Qızıl
Stîrcea, Glodeni Kiçik Düşman
Taraclia Taraqlı, Daraqlı
Tătărești, Cahul Tatareş
Tătărești, Strășeni Tatareş
Turunchuk River Turunçuq çayı
Gagauzia Qaqavuz Yeri, Göy Oğuz Yeri
Baurci Baurçu, Bayırçı
Beşalma Beşalma
Beşghioz Beşgöz
Bugeac Bucaq
Carbalia Qurbağalı
Cazaclia Qazayaq
Ceadâr-Lunga Çadır, Çadır-Lunga
Chioselia Rusă Kösəli Rus
Chiriet-Lunga Kiriyet, Kiriyət
Chirsova Başköy
Cioc-Maidan Çox-Meydan
Cişmichioi Çeşməköy
Comrat Komrat, Qonrat
Congaz Kongaz
Copceac Qıpçaq
Cotovscoe Kırlannar, Qırlanlar
Dezghingea Dənizcə, Dezgincə
Etulia Tüklüköy
Ferapontievca Parapontika
Gaidar Heydər, Haydar
Joltai Coltay
Tomai Tomay
Vulcăneşti Valkaneş

Mongolia
Mongolia Monğolustan, Monqolustan, Monğol Eli
Ulaanbaatar Hörgü, Örgü, Ulan-Batur
Bor-Öndör Bor-Hündür
Choibalsan Bayan-Tümən
Darkhan Tərxan, Darxan
Gobi Desert Qobi çölü, Qobu çölü
Karakorum Qaraqorum
Ordu-Baliq Ordu-Balıq, Qarabalğasun
Otukan Ötükən, Ötügən
Ölgii Ölkə, Ölgi
Öndörkhaan Hündürxan
Sharyngol Sarıgöl
Tsetserleg Çiçəklik

Montenegro
Montenegro Qaradağ
Podgorica Böyürtlən (Böyürtkən)
Ada Bojana Boyana Adası, Buna Adası
Bijelo Polje Aqova (آقاووه)
Cetinje Çetinə
Gusinje Qusna (گوسن)
Herceg Novi Kastelnovo
Pljevlja Daşlıca
Sandžak Sancaq, Yeni Bazar Sancağı
Ulcinj Ülgün

Morocco
Morocco Mərakeş, Məğrib Məmləkəti
Agadir Aqadir
Casablanca Dar-öl-Bəyda
El Jadida əl-Cədidə
Errachidia ər-Rəşidiyyə
Essaouira Suvəyr
Fès Fəs
Kenitra Qənitrə
Marrakech Mərakeş
Meknes Məknəs
Mohammedia Məhəmmədiyyə
Oujda Ucda
Rabat Rəbat
Río de Oro Vadi əz-Zəhəb
Settat Səttat
Tangier Təncə
Tétouan Titvan, Tətvan

Myanmar
Rakhine Arakan
Sittwe Akyab
Yangon Ranqun

Netherlands
Netherlands Fələməng
Gouda Quda, Xavda
The Hague Haaqa, Ləhey
Turkeye Türkiyə, Niderland Türkiyəsi

North Macedonia
North Macedonia Quzey Makedoniya Cümhuriyyəti, Şimali Makedoniya Respublikası
Skopje Üsküb (اسكوب)
Berovo Berova
Bitola Manastır
Debar Dəbrə
Delčevo Sultaniyə
Demir Hisar Dəmir Hasar
Demir Kapija Dəmir Qapı
Dojran Doyran
Džepište Çəpiştə
Gevgelija Gəvgəli
Gostivar Qostivar
Kavadarci Qavadar
Kočani Qoçana (قوچانه)
Kodžadžik Qocacıq
Kriva Palanka Əyri Dərə, Əyridərə
Kruševo Qırşova (قيرشووه)
Kumanovo Qumanova
Lozovo Cüməli
Adžibegovo Hacıbəyli
Adžimatovo Hacı Əhmədli
Bekirloja Bekirli
Dorfulija Dorfullu
Karatmanovo Qaratmanlı
Saramzalino Sarı Həmzəli
Kjoselari Kösələr
Makedonski Brod Brod (برود)
Negotino Neğotin (نغوتين)
Prilep Pirləpə
Radoviš Radoviş
Resen Rəsnə
Šar Mountains Şar dağları
Štip İştib
Strumica Ustrumca
Sveti Nikole Kilisəli, Kilsəli
Tetovo Qalxandələn
Veles Körpülü

Oman
Oman Umman
Dhofar Governorate Zufar
Khuriya Muriya Islands Xuriyə-Muriyə Adaları
Ibri İbri
Muscat Masqat
Muttrah Matrah
Ras al Hadd Rəs əl-Hədd
Seeb əs-Sib

Palestine
Palestine Fələstin
East Jerusalem Doğu Qüds, Şərqi Qüds
Beit Jala Beyt Cala
Bethlehem Bidilqim, Beytləhm
Dead Sea Ölü dəniz
Galilee əl-Cəlil, Cəlilə
Gaza Qəzza
Hebron Əl Xəlil
Jabalia Cəbəliyyə
Jenin Cənin
Jericho Əriha
Jordan River Ürdün çayı, İordan çayı
Khan Yunis Xan Yunus, Xan-Yunis
Rafah Rəfah
Masjid Al-Aqsa Tapınaq təpəsi, Məbəd dağı, Məscidül-Əqsa, Beytul-Müqəddəs
Dome of the Rock Qübbətüs-Səhra
Foundation Stone Müəlləq daşı
Tulkarm Tulkərim
West Bank Cisürdün, Qərbi Şəriyyə

Poland
Poland Löhüstan, Lehistan, Poloniya, Polşa
Warszawa  Varşav, Varşova, Varşu, Varşava
Częstochowa Çenstoxova
Gdańsk Dansiq
Gierów Girov
Gorzów Wielkopolski Vartadakı Landsberq, Qojuv-Velikopolski
Katowice Qatovitsa, Katoviçe, Katovitse
Kraków Krakov
Kruszyniany Krujinyana
Lublin Lüblin
Łódź Luc
Pomerania Pomeraniya
Przemyśl Pirzamisil
Sosnowiec Sosnovets
Szczecin Şetsin
Tarnów Tarnuv
Wrocław Buruslu

Portugal
Portugal Portəgiz
Alcacer do Sal Qəsri Əbu Dəniz
Algarve əl-Qərb
Agualva-Cacém Qasım
Almada əl-Mədən
Almodôvar əl-Müdəvvər
Azores Azorlar
Beja Bəca, Bəcayüz Zeyt
Coimbra Qulumriyə
Évora Yəburə
Faro Uxşünubə
Fátima Fatimə
Iberian Peninsula İber Yarımadası
Lisboa Üşbünə
Loulé Ulyə
Marvão Mərvan
Porto Uburtu, Ubürtü
Setúbal Şətübər
Silves Şilb
Tavira Təbirə

Romania
Romania Romanya, Romaniya, Romıniya, Rumıniya
Bucharest Bükrəş, Bükrəş, Buxarest
Bacău Baka, Baqa
Botoșani Potşan
Brașov Barasu
Brăila İbrayıl
Cluj-Napoca Qaloşvar
Constanța Köstəncə
Dobrogea Dobruca
Focșani Foqşan, Fokşan
Galați Qalas
Giurgiu Yergöyü
Hunedoara County Hunyad bölgəsi
Iași Yaş
Târgu Mureș Maroşbazarı
Transylvania Ərdəl
Tulcea Hora-Təpə, Tulça
Oradea Varad
Satu Mare Soxmar
Sâniob Şənköy
Sibiu Səbin
Timișoara Temeşvar
Wallachia Əflak

Russia
Russia Ərəsey, Ruset (Uruset, Urusyet, Rusyet), Rusiya, Rusya
Moscow Məskəv, Masqav, Mosqof, Masqaf, Mosqova, Moskva
Abakan Ağban (Khakas: Ağban)
Achinsk Açıq-Tura (Khakas: Açıx-Tura)
Akhtubinsk Ağtəpə
Aksay Ağsay ("ağ" + "say")
Alapayevsk Alapay
Almetyevsk Əlmət
Anapa Buğurqala
Aniva  Rutaka ( Rūtaka)
Apsheronsk Abşeron, Afşaran
Argun Arğın
Arkhangelsk Arxangel
Armavir Ermənikənd ( — "Armenian Village", old Russian name: Armyasky Aul — "Armenian Village")
Asha Əşə
Astrakhan Həştərxan
Aznakayevo Aznaqay
Azov Azaq (old Russian name: Azak)
Baikal Baygöl
Balakovo Balaqav, Balaqav-Yurd (old Russian name: Balakov-Yurt)
Balashov Balaşav
Barabinsk Baraba
Barnaul Barnaul, Barnavıl
Baksan Basqan
Bataysk Batısu (from Bataisu — "Water of Batu")
Beloretsk Beloret
Berezniki (Bardymsky District) Qayınaul, Qayın avıl (old Russian name: Kanaul)
Bichurino Uzun Yalın
Birsk Börü
Biysk Yaş-Tura, Bəyqadın (old Russian name: Biykatunskaya)
Blagodarny Sulduz (in nomadic horde language: Soldus)
Budyonnovsk Qarabağlı (old Russian name: Karabagly)
Bugulma Bügülmə
Buguruslan Buğuruslan (Buğa Aslan (Ruslan/Arslan)) 
Buynaksk Teymurxanşura
Buzuluk Buzovluq
Chebarkul Çəbərgöl
Cheboksary Çabaqsar
Chelyabinsk Çələbi
Cherkessk Battalpaşa (old Russian name: Batalpashinsk)
Chernogorsk Qaradaş (Khakas: Xaratas)
Chistopol Cökədağ, Çistay
Dalnerechensk İman (Old Russian name: Iman)
Derbent Dəmirqapı (Temirkapu/Temirkapı in Terekeme dialect)
Dimitrovgrad Mələkəs
Dyurtyuli Dördevli, Dördöylü 
Gelendzhik Gəlincik
Georgiyevsk Qum
Gorno-Altaysk Dağlı Altay
Grozny Sevincqala
Gudermes Güydürməz
Irbit İrbit 
Irkutsk Ürküt
Izhevsk İjav
Izberbash İzbirbaş or Hizbirbaş
Kaluga Xoloğa (Khazar: Xologa)
Kamyshin Qamışlı
Kanash Gənəş
Karabulak (Ingushetia) Qarabulaq
Karasuk Qarasu (Chulym: Qarasuq, Khakas: Qarasuğ)
Kartaly Qartal (Qaratal)
Kasimov Qasım, Xankirman
Kazan Qazan
Kemerovo Kəmər
Khabarovsk Xabarav
Khanty-Mansiysk İştək-Voğul (old Russian name: Ostyako-Vogulsk)
Khasavyurt Yarıqsu (Old , Old Russian name before 1847: Yaryksuv), Xasavyurd
Kholmsk Maoka ( Maoka)
Kineshma Gənəşmə
Kirov Qulun
Kislovodsk Acısu
Kizilyurt Çiryurd, Qızılyurd
Kizlyar Qızılyar
Komsomolsk-on-Amur Amurdakı Komsomolsk
Kopchikovo Çuxur
Kopeysk Tuqaygöl (old Russian name: Tugaykul)
Korsakov Otomari (Ōtomari)
Krasnoyarsk Qızıl Yar (original in Khakas language: Xızıl Çar)
Kuban Quman
Krasnoufimsk Qızılyar
Kumertau Kömürdağ
Kungur Küngür
Kurgan Qorğan
Kurganinsk Qorğanlı
Kurilsk Şanamura ( Shanamura)
Kuybyshev Qayın
Kyshtym Qışdım
Kyzyl Qızıl
Labinsk Novruzaul, Novruzavıl
Lyantor Ləntor
Magnitogorsk Maqnitdağ
Makarov Şirutoru ( Shirutoru)
Makhachkala İnciqala
Mariinsk Qıyalı (old Russian name: Kiyskoye, from name of Kiya River, which means in Turkic languages rocky slope, cliff, in Old Azerbaiajani Turkish is "Qıya")
Mezhdurechensk Tomus (old Russian name: Tomusinsky)
Miass Miyəs
Menzelinsk Mənzilə
Mozdok Məzdək
Myski Tomazaq
Naberezhnye Chelny Yar Çallı
Nalchik Nalcıq
Neftekamsk Neftekama
Neftekumsk Qamış-Burun (Old Russian name: Kamysh-Burun)
Neryungri Nörüngürü
Nevelsk Honto ( Honto)
Nevinnomyssk Arıqız
Nizhnekamsk Aşağı Kama
Nizhnevartovsk Aşağı Varta
Nizhny Novgorod Daşqala, Nijqar, Aşağı Novqorod
Novocheboksarsk Yeni Çabaqsar
Novokuznetsk Aba-Tura (Khakas: Aba-Tura)
Novorossiysk Sucuqqala (old Russian name: Sudzhuk-Kale)
Novosibirsk Novosibir, Yeni Sibir
Novotroitsk Yeni Troy qalası
Omsk Ombu
Orenburg Orunbor, Orunbörk
Orsk Yamanqala
Oryol Ayrılı
Osinniki Tağdağal
Oskol Rusqol (one of the etymological versions)
Perm Perim
Pokhvistnevo Qutluğuş
Poronaysk Şikuka
Primorsko-Akhtarsk Ağdar-Bağdar, Axtar-Baxtar (old Russian name: Akhtar-Bakhtar)
Pugachyov Məscidli (old Russian name: Mechetnaya)
Pyatigorsk Beşdağ
Rostov-on-Don Tındakı Rostov
Rtishchevo İrtış
Ryazan Rəzən
Saint Petersburg Fitilbörk
Sakhalin Karafuto
Samara Samar
Saratov Sarıdağ
Sarov Sarıqılınc (Russian name till 1967: Sary kylych)
Sasovo Saz
Satka Çatqı
Selenga Seləngə
Serdobsk Sartaba
Severo-Kurilsk Kaşivabara
Shakhtyorsk Toro ( Toro)
Sharypovo Şarıp (Şərif?)
Slavyansk-na-Kubani Yeni Qopul
Solikamsk Saliqam
Sovetsk Kükirman
Stavropol İstarapol, Şadqala
Sterlitamak Stərlidamaq
Sudzha Suca ("Su" – "water" + "-ca")
Surgut Surğut, Surqut
Taganrog Tayğan (Karaim: Tayğan )
Temryuk ?
Temnikov Tümen, Tümən
Tobolsk Tobul
Tolyatti İdildəki İstarapol
Tomsk Tom, Tom-Tura (Khakas: Tom-Tura)
Troitsk Troy qalası
Tsaritsyno Xanaul, Xanavıl
Tuymazy Toymazı
Tyumen Tümen
Ufa Öfö
Uglegorsk Esutoru
Ulyanovsk Simbir
Ural River Yayıq (old Russian name: Yaik)
Usolye-Sibirskoye Dabhan
Ust-Dzheguta Cökətəy Ayağı
Verkhnyaya Salda Yuxarı Sallı
Verkhoyansk Yuxarı Yanı
Vladivostok Uraşio
Volga İdil, Atıl (Old Azerbaijani: آطل)
Volgograd Sarıçin, Sarısu
Volzhsk İdilqala ("Volga" + "city", "Volga city")
Volzhsky Yuxarı Ağtəpə (old Russian name: Verkhnyaya Akhtuba)
Vyatskiye Polyany Nuxrat Alanı
Yalutorovsk Yaylı-Tura, Yağlı-Tura (old Russian name: Yavlu-Tura)
Yaroslavl Yarıslav
Yekaterinburg Yekatirinbor
Yelabuga Alabuğa
Yelets Qarasu
Yemanzhelinsk Yamanyılğa
Yuzhno-Sakhalinsk Toyohara
Zainsk Zəy
Zelenodolsk Yaşıl Özən
Zhigulyovsk Yekili
Zhiguli Mountains Bacanaq dağları
Zhukotin Cökədağ

Serbia
Serbia Sırbstan, Serbiya

Syria
Syria Şam vilayyəti
Damascus Dəməşq, Şam şəhəri

Turkey
Turkey Türkiyə
Ankara Ankara
Afyonkarahisar Afyonqarahisar, Afyonqarahasar
Aksaray Ağsaray
Alanya Əlaiyyə
Ardahan Ərdəhan
Balıkesir Balıkəsir, Balıqasar, Balıqhasar, Karesi, Qaresi
Bingöl Bingöl, Mingöl
Çanakkale Çanaqqala
Denizli Dənizli
Diyarbakır Diyarbəkir
Edirne Ədirnə
Elazığ Elazığ, Alazığ
Erzincan Ərzincan
Erzurum Ərzurum
Eskişehir Əskişəhir, Əskişəhər
Gümüşhane Gümüşxanə, Gümüşxana
İstanbul İstanbul, Konstantinopol, Konstantinopolis, Konstaniyyə
Kahramanmaraş Qəhrəmanmaraş
Kırıkkale Qırıqqala
Kırklareli Qırxlareli
Kırşehir Qırşəhər
Nevşehir Nevşəhər

Turkmenistan
Turkmenistan Türkmənistan
Ashgabat Aşqabad

Ukraine
Ukraine Ukrayna
Kyiv Kıyiv (Ukrainian name: Kyiv), Kiev, Kiyev, Sambat, Kirman-Qiyabə
Berdiansk Bərdə (Karaim: Berde)
Lviv İlbav, Liviv, Lviv, Lvov
Ivano-Frankivsk Daşlı Şəhər (Karaim: Taslı Sağar)
Mariupol Məryəmpol (Urum: Maryampol)
Melitopol Qızlıyar (Karaim: Qızlıyar)
Mykolaiv Balaban
Odessa Hacıbəy (old Russian and Ukrainian name: Khadjibey), Ades (Karaim: Ades)

United States
America Amerka, Amerqa, Ameriqa, Amerika, Yeni Dünya, Yeni Yer
United States Ameriqa Qoşma Ştatları, Amerika Birləşmiş Ştatları
Florida Turconia (Türkiniyə, Türkniyə, Türküniyə)
Key West Batı Türkiyə, Qərbi Türkiyə (West Turkey)
They are generally written in Azerbaijani alphabet. "Vaşinqton" ("Washington"), "Kaliforniya" ("California"), "Çikaqo" ("Chicago"), "Filadelfiya" ("Philadelphia") etc.

See also
List of European exonyms
List of Turkish exonyms

References

 
Lists of exonyms
Exonyms
Exonyms
Exonyms
Exonyms